Jacqueline ("Jackie") McKernan (born 1 July 1965) is a retired Northern Irish discus thrower. She represented Great Britain and Northern Ireland at three Olympic Games (1988, 1992, 1996) and won silver medals at the Commonwealth Games in 1990 and the Universiade in 1993.

Career
Born in Belfast, McKernan was a member of the City of Lisburn Athletics Club. She finished 18th in qualifying at the 1988 Seoul Olympics, before going on to win a silver medal at the 1990 Commonwealth Games representing Norther Ireland, with a throw of 54.86 metres. She then finished 28th in qualifying at the 1992 Barcelona Olympics.

McKernan's personal best throw is 60.72 metres, achieved when winning the silver medal at the Universiade on 17 July 1993 in Buffalo. This is the Northern Irish record, and places her sixth on the UK all-time list, behind Meg Ritchie, Jade Lally, Venissa Head, Philippa Roles and Shelley Newman. She finished 20th in the qualifying round at the 1996 Atlanta Olympics with 58.88  metres (her best throw at an Olympics).

International competitions

National titles
6 AAA Championships (1988, 1991, 1992, 1994, 1996, 1997)
5 UK Championships (1989, 1990, 1991, 1992, 1993)

References

External links
 

1965 births
Living people
Discus throwers from Northern Ireland
Female athletes from Northern Ireland
Athletes (track and field) at the 1988 Summer Olympics
Athletes (track and field) at the 1992 Summer Olympics
Athletes (track and field) at the 1996 Summer Olympics
Athletes (track and field) at the 1986 Commonwealth Games
Athletes (track and field) at the 1990 Commonwealth Games
Athletes (track and field) at the 1994 Commonwealth Games
Athletes (track and field) at the 1998 Commonwealth Games
Athletes (track and field) at the 2002 Commonwealth Games
Olympic athletes of Great Britain
Commonwealth Games silver medallists for Northern Ireland
Commonwealth Games medallists in athletics
Universiade medalists in athletics (track and field)
Sportspeople from Belfast
Universiade silver medalists for Great Britain
Medalists at the 1993 Summer Universiade
Medallists at the 1990 Commonwealth Games